In enzymology, a flavonol-3-O-glucoside L-rhamnosyltransferase is an enzyme that catalyzes the chemical reaction

UDP-L-rhamnose + a flavonol 3-O-D-glucoside  UDP + a flavonol 3-O-[beta-L-rhamnosyl-(1->6)-beta-D-glucoside]

Thus, the two substrates of this enzyme are UDP-L-rhamnose and flavonol 3-O-D-glucoside, whereas its two products are UDP and [[flavonol 3-O-[beta-L-rhamnosyl-(1->6)-beta-D-glucoside]]].

This enzyme belongs to the family of glycosyltransferases, specifically the hexosyltransferases.  The systematic name of this enzyme class is UDP-L-rhamnose:flavonol-3-O-D-glucoside 6''-O-L-rhamnosyltransferase. Other names in common use include uridine diphosphorhamnose-flavonol 3-O-glucoside, rhamnosyltransferase, and UDP-rhamnose:flavonol 3-O-glucoside rhamnosyltransferase.  This enzyme participates in flavonoid biosynthesis.

References 

 
 

EC 2.4.1
Enzymes of unknown structure
Flavonols metabolism